John M. Williams (1935–2021) was an American football coach.

John M. Williams may also refer to:

 John M. Williams Jr. (born 1977), Canadian football player
 John McKay Williams (1945–2012), American football player
 John McLaughlin Williams (born 1957), American conductor and violinist

See also 
 John Williams (disambiguation)
 Johnny Madison Williams Jr. (born 1951), American bank robber